Samer El Masri is an Australian former rugby league footballer who represented Lebanon at the 2000 Rugby League World Cup.

Background
El Masri was born in Sydney, New South Wales, Australia.

He is the brother of Australian and Lebanon international, Hazem El Masri.

Playing career
Samer was born in Australia to ethnic Lebanese parents, Khaled and Amal. El Masri first played for Lebanon at the 2000 World Cup, where he played in all three of his countries matches. He later played for his country in 2002, 2003 and in World Cup qualifying matches in 2006.

References

Living people
Lebanese rugby league players
Australian people of Lebanese descent
Australian rugby league players
Rugby league fullbacks
Lebanon national rugby league team players
Rugby league wingers
Year of birth missing (living people)